Honduras participated in the 2010 Summer Youth Olympics in Singapore.

Medalists

Judo

Individual

Team

Swimming

Weightlifting

References

External links
Competitors List: Honduras

Nations at the 2010 Summer Youth Olympics
2010 in Honduran sport
Honduras at the Youth Olympics